Port Cornwallis is a port situated on Ross Island, off the NE coast of North Andaman. This should not be confused with Ross Island, which is opposite Port Blair, South Andaman. 

There is a lighthouse, commissioned in 1973, near Port Cornwallis, "on the summit of Bopung Hill at the entrance of Aerial Bay."

References

Cities and towns in South Andaman district
Lighthouses in India
Ports and harbours of the Andaman and Nicobar Islands
Tourist attractions in the Andaman and Nicobar Islands